The 1968 WCHA Men's Ice Hockey Tournament was the 9th conference playoff in league history. The tournament was played between March 5 and March 9, 1968. All games were played at home team campus sites. By being declared as co-champions, both North Dakota and Denver were invited to participate in the 1968 NCAA University Division Men's Ice Hockey Tournament.

Though not official designations, North Dakota is considered as the East Regional Champion† and Denver as the West Regional Champion‡.

Format
All eight teams in the WCHA were eligible for the tournament and were seeded No. 1 through No. 8 according to their final conference standings. In the first round the first and eighth seeds, the second and seventh seeds, the third and sixth seeds and the fourth and fifth seeds played a single game with the winners advancing to the second round. After the first round the remaining teams were reseeded No. 1 through No. 4 according to their final conference standings and advanced to the second round. In the second round the first and fourth seeds and the second and third seeds were matched in two-game series where the school that scored the higher number of goals was declared the winner. The victors of the second round series were declared as co-conference tournament champions.

Conference standings
Note: GP = Games played; W = Wins; L = Losses; T = Ties; PCT = Winning percentage; GF = Goals for; GA = Goals against

Bracket

Teams are reseeded after the first round

Note: * denotes overtime period(s)

First round

(1) Denver vs. (8) Minnesota-Duluth

(2) Michigan Tech vs. (7) Colorado College

(3) North Dakota vs. (6) Michigan State

(4) Michigan vs. (5) Minnesota

Second round

(1) Denver vs. (5) Minnesota

(2) Michigan Tech vs. (3) North Dakota

Tournament awards
None

See also
Western Collegiate Hockey Association men's champions

References

External links
WCHA.com
1967–68 WCHA Standings
1967–68 NCAA Standings
2013–14 Colorado College Tigers Media Guide
2013–14 Denver Pioneers Media Guide
2013–14 Michigan Wolverines Media Guide; Through the Years
2013–14 Michigan State Spartans Media Guide; Section 5
2013–14 Minnesota Golden Gophers Media Guide 
2012–13 Minnesota-Duluth Bulldogs Media Guide
2013–14 North Dakota Hockey Media Guide

WCHA Men's Ice Hockey Tournament
Wcha Men's Ice Hockey Tournament